Inter-Insular cricket refers to cricket contests between representative teams of Jersey and Guernsey in the Channel Islands. An inter-insular match has been played annually between the two sides since 1950 and often attracts crowds above 1,000. It is often referred as ‘reds vs greens’ contest. The format has varied over the years but has been played as a 50-over contest in recent times and a Women’s Inter-Insular match was first played in 2009. In 2018, the format switched to a series of Twenty20 matches, although the traditional 50-over match returned from 2019 in addition to the Twenty20 series. The Twenty20 matches have had Twenty20 International status since 2019, as the International Cricket Council granted T20I status to all of its members from the start of the year. On 31 May 2019, there was also a one-off Women's Twenty20 International (WT20I) fixture between the two women's teams. It was the first WT20I match for both teams.

History

Guernsey and Jersey had played inter-insular games between clubs in the 1930s. After the war, there had been two annual games which appeared to be made up of players from different clubs to make an island team. In 1949 the press reported that GICC (Guernsey Island Cricket Club) would meet JICC (Jersey Island Cricket Club). It would appear that the games were played all day, irrespective that the second team had passed the score of the first. In 1950, GICC scoring 129, followed by JICC achieving 196 for 4.

In 1951 the media began calling the teams Guernsey and Jersey rather than GICC and JICC. The Elizabeth College magazine for 1951 reported V G Collenette as the captain of the first Guernsey v Jersey match in 1950. The 1952 match did not take place as Jersey did not turn up in Guernsey, having "forgotten to select a team", according to the Guernsey Press reporter. The same problem occurred in 1956. Caps for the inter island match were first awarded by GCA (Guernsey Cricket Association) in 1960, but backdated to 1957. GCA claimed the first match was in 1957.

Jersey claimed an outright win in 1960, followed by three successive wins for Guernsey. Several draws took place in the 1960s and 70s, leading to the match being switched to a pure limited overs format rather than a timed game. Between 1992 and 2001, Jersey won ten matches in a row.

In 2018, the format switched to a series of Twenty20 matches, but the traditional 50-over match returned from 2019 in addition to the Twenty20 series.

There were no inter-insular matches in 2020 or 2021 due to the COVID-19 pandemic.

Men's One-Day results (Inter-Insular Trophy)

Matches summary (as of 2022)

Source: Guernsey Cricket

Men's Twenty20 International series results (Inter-Insular Cup)

Series summary (as of 2022)

Matches summary (as of 2022)

Source: Guernsey Cricket

Women's Twenty20 International series results

Series summary (as of 2022)

Matches summary (as of 2022)

Sponsorship

 Haig Scotch Whisky Trophy (1978 to 1988)
 Carlsberg Lager Trophy (1989 to 1993)
 Tetley Bitter Challenge (1994 to 1997)
 Flemings Trophy (1998 to 2000)
 Cherry Godfrey Challenge (2003 to 2005)
 HSBC Trophy (2007 to 2009)
 Marlborough Trophy (2010 to 2013)
 NatWest Trophy (2014)
 Odey Wealth Challenge Trophy (2015)
 InfrasoftTech (2018–)

See also

Muratti Vase - the equivalent event in football
Siam Cup - the equivalent event in rugby union
Guernsey cricket team
Jersey cricket team
Jersey women's cricket team
Guernsey women's cricket team

References

External links 
 Guernsey Cricket Statistics

Sport in the Channel Islands
Cricket in Guernsey
Cricket in Jersey